Indonesia competed at the 2015 World Aquatics Championships in Kazan, Russia from 24 July to 9 August 2015.

Diving

Indonesian divers qualified for the individual spots and synchronized teams at the World Championships.

Men

Open water swimming

Indonesia has qualified four swimmers to compete in the open water marathon.

Swimming

Indonesian swimmers have achieved qualifying standards in the following events (up to a maximum of 2 swimmers in each event at the A-standard entry time, and 1 at the B-standard):

Men

Women

Synchronized swimming

Indonesia fielded a full team of eight synchronized swimmers to compete in each of the following events.

Women

References

External links
Kazan 2015 Official Site

Nations at the 2015 World Aquatics Championships
2015 in Indonesian sport
Indonesia at the World Aquatics Championships